Klondike is an unincorporated community in Wabash Township, Tippecanoe County, in the U.S. state of Indiana.

The community is part of the Lafayette, Indiana Metropolitan Statistical Area.

History
A post office was established at Klondike in 1897, and remained in operation until it was discontinued in 1900.

Geography

Education
Klondike is served by the Klondike Branch public library, a branch of the Tippecanoe County Public Library.

References

Unincorporated communities in Tippecanoe County, Indiana
Unincorporated communities in Indiana
Lafayette metropolitan area, Indiana